Joseph Koppe (October 19, 1930 – September 27, 2006), born Joseph Kopchia, was an American professional baseball  shortstop, who played in Major League Baseball (MLB) for the Milwaukee Braves, Philadelphia Phillies, and Los Angeles Angels.

Career

Koppe made his big league debut on August 9, 1958, for the Braves. He appeared in 16 games for Milwaukee in the later part of the season, but did not make an appearance when the Braves won the National League pennant and went to the World Series. Just prior to the  season, Koppe was traded to the Phillies as part of a six-player deal.

Koppe came into his own in his first season in Philadelphia. He saw action in 126 games (113 at shortstop), in his true rookie season. Koppe put up a respectable offensive season, hitting .261, with 18 doubles, seven triples, and seven home runs, while scoring 68 runs. His seven triples placed 8th in the National League (NL).

Koppe saw no playing time for the Cardinals and did not see any MLB action for a full month. He was purchased by the Angels on June 19, 1961.

As an Angel, Koppe made a serious effort to return to the performance level of his rookie season. He never saw more than 375 at-bats in any season for the Angels and finished his career with the team a .236 hitter. Koppe was primarily a middle infielder, however, and was always able to contribute defensively.

Death

Koppe died on September 27, 2006, in Ann Arbor, Michigan, after a seven-year battle with cancer.

References

External links

1930 births
2006 deaths
Baseball players from Detroit
California Angels players
Corpus Christi Aces players
Deaths from cancer in Michigan
Greenville Majors players
Los Angeles Angels players
Lubbock Hubbers players
Major League Baseball shortstops
Milwaukee Braves players
Philadelphia Phillies players
Portland Beavers players
Sacramento Solons players
Seattle Angels players
Shreveport Sports players
Spokane Indians players
Wichita Braves players